The Far Eastern smooth flounder (Liopsetta pinnifasciata) is a flatfish of the family Pleuronectidae. It is a demersal fish that lives on bottoms in salt, brackish and fresh waters. Its native habitat is the temperate waters of the northwestern Pacific, specifically Japan, Russia and the Kuril Islands.

References

Far Eastern smooth flounder
Kuril Islands
Fish of Japan
Far Eastern smooth flounder